War of the Worlds is a television series produced by Fox Networks Group and StudioCanal–backed Urban Myth Films. The series is created and written by Howard Overman and directed by Gilles Coulier and Richard Clark. The series is an adaptation of The War of the Worlds, an 1898 novel by H. G. Wells about Earth coming to terms in the wake of a sudden Martian invasion. It is the third television adaptation of the novel. It stars Daisy Edgar-Jones (for the first two seasons) and Gabriel Byrne, along with an ensemble supporting cast, including a number of co-stars who change over time.

The first season consists of eight episodes and premiered in France in October 2019. An eight-episode second season premiered in France in May 2021. War of the Worlds was renewed for a third season in July 2021, which aired in September 2022.

Premise 
The series takes place in contemporary Britain and France, but it serves as a re-imagining of the classic H. G. Wells novel.

Cast

Main
 Gabriel Byrne as Bill Ward
 Léa Drucker as Catherine Durand 
 Daisy Edgar-Jones as Emily Gresham (seasons 1–2)
 Elizabeth McGovern as Helen Brown, Bill's ex-wife (season 1)
 Bayo Gbadamosi as Kariem Gat Wich Machar 
 Adel Bencherif as Colonel Mustafa Mokrani (season 1; guest season 2)
 Emilie de Preissac as Sophia Durand, Catherine's sister 
 Natasha Little as Sarah Gresham, Emily and Tom's mother 
 Ty Tennant as Tom Gresham, Emily's brother 
 Stephen Campbell Moore as Jonathan Gresham, Emily and Tom's father 
 Stéphane Caillard as Chloe Dumont 
 Aaron Heffernan as Ash Daniel (season 1 & 3; recurring season 2)
 Mathieu Torloting as Sacha Dumont, Chloe's son (recurring season 1; season 2) 
 Pearl Chanda as Zoe (season 2-3)
 Molly Windsor as Martha (season 3)
 Lizzie Brocheré as Juliet (season 3)
 Lukas Haas as Richard (season 3)

Featured 
The below actors are credited in the opening titles of only one or two episodes in which they play a significant role.
 Georgina Rich as Rachel 
 Michael Marcus as Dan Ward, Bill and Helen's son
 Paul Gorostidi as Nathan 
 Théo Christine as Saaid 
 Alysson Paradis as Officer Clara 
 Guillaume Gouix as Noah Dumont, Chloe's brother

Episodes

Season 1 (2019)

Season 2 (2021)

Season 3 (2022)

Production

Development 
War of the Worlds is produced by Fox Networks Group and StudioCanal. AGC Television co-finances and co-distributes the series. The series is executive produced by Overman, Julian Murphy and Johnny Capps. Gilles Coulier and Richard Clark each directed four episodes of the first season, with Coulier directing the first four episode and Clark directing the last four. The series was written by Howard Overman.

By October 2019, the creative team had begun work on a second season. Richard Clark returned to direct the first four episodes, with Ben A. Williams directing the final four. In July 2021, War of the Worlds was renewed for a third season, which aired in 2022. Season 3 is directed by Indra Siera and Jonas Alexander Arnby.

Casting 
Gabriel Byrne and Elizabeth McGovern star in the series. They are joined by Daisy Edgar-Jones and Bayo Gbadamosi as co-stars and Aimee-Ffion Edwards, Stéphane Caillard, Adel Bencherif, Guillaume Gouix, Léa Drucker and Natasha Little as main supporting cast. Greg Kinnear was originally set to star, but was not listed in the starring cast list when it was revealed by Deadline Hollywood in January 2019.

Filming 
Production for the first season took place in the United Kingdom, France and Belgium. The series was filmed in Bristol in March 2019, as well as filming in Cardiff, Newport and London.

The second season began filming on July 13, 2020, with filming concluding on October 22, 2020.

Release 
The first series was released in full on MyCanal in France on October 28, 2019, before being broadcast from the same day in weekly batches of two episodes and was released in most parts of Europe and Africa weekly between October 30 and December 18, 2019. The series premiered in the United States on February 16, 2020, on Epix; in the UK on March 5, 2020; and in Canada on October 7, 2020, on CBC Television. Canal+ and Fox Networks Group have the rights to release the series in Europe and Africa. AGC Television distributes the series to the North American market and co-distributes, with StudioCanal, to Latin America, Asia, Australia, New Zealand and the Middle East. Fox Networks Group releases the series in Europe. The series broadcasts on Fox in more than 50 countries and on Epix in the United States and territories.

The eight-episode second season was released in full on May 17, 2021 in France on MyCanal, before being broadcast from the same day in weekly batches of two episodes, mirroring the release of the first season. The season premiered May 24, 2021 on Fox in South Africa; in the United States on Epix on June 6, 2021; and on October 6, 2021, in Canada on CBC Gem.

The eight-episode third season began broadcast from September 5, 2022, in weekly batches of two episodes. The season premiered in the United States on Epix on September 12, 2022.

Reception
Ben Dowell in The Times gave the first series four out of five stars. The AV Club dubbed it "compelling if derivative".

References

External links 
 

2010s American science fiction television series
2019 American television series debuts
2019 French television series debuts
Alien invasions in television
English-language television shows
French science fiction television series
French-language television shows
Television series about extraterrestrial life
Television series by StudioCanal
Television shows based on British novels
Television shows set in Europe
Works based on The War of the Worlds